Tapinoma sinense is a species of ant in the genus Tapinoma. Described by Emery in 1925, the species is endemic to Asia.

References

Tapinoma
Hymenoptera of Asia
Insects described in 1925